The 2015–16 Drexel Dragons men's basketball team represented Drexel University during the 2015–16 NCAA Division I men's basketball season. The Dragons, led by 15th year head coach Bruiser Flint, played their home games at the Daskalakis Athletic Center and were members of the Colonial Athletic Association.

They finished the season 6–25, 3–15 in CAA play to finish in ninth place in the regular season. They lost in the quarterfinals of the CAA tournament to Hofstra.

On March 7, 2016, following the end of Drexel's season, Bruiser Flint was fired as head basketball coach after 15 seasons with the team.

Previous season

The 2014–15 Drexel Dragons finished the season with a record of 10-18 after losing to the College of Charleston in the 2015 CAA men's basketball tournament. The team went 9–9 in the CAA regular season, and was the 7 seed in the conference tournament.

Off season

Departures

Incoming transfers

Miles Overton was not eligible to play in the 2015-16 season due to NCAA transfer rules.  Overton redshirted and entered the 2016-17 season as a redshirt sophomore with 3 years of eligibility remaining.

2015 Recruiting Class

Roster

On 18 November 2015, the team announced that Redshirt Sophomore guard Major Canady would miss his second consecutive full season due to a knee injury.  Canady redshirted the season for the second consecutive year, and retained 3 years of eligibility entering the 2016–17 season.

Schedule

|-
!colspan=12 style=| Non-conference regular season
|-

|-
!colspan=12 style=| CAA regular season

|-
!colspan=12 style=| CAA Tournament

Team statistics
As of the end of the season. 
 Indicates team leader in each category. 
(FG%, FT% leader = minimum 50 att.; 3P% leader = minimum 20 att.)

Awards
Terrell Allen
CAA All-Rookie Team
CAA Rookie of the Week (2)

Kazembe Abif
Team Most Valuable Player
"Sweep" Award (team leader in blocks)

Rodney Williams
CAA All-Academic Team
Team Academic Award

Tavon Allen
Dragon "D" Award (team's top defensive player)
Preseason CAA All-Conference Team Honorable Mention

Terrell Allen
Assist Award (team leader in assists)

Sammy Mojica
Samuel D. Cozen Award (team's most improved player)

Chandler Fraser-Pauls
Donald Shank Spirit & Dedication Award

See also
 2015–16 Drexel Dragons women's basketball team

References

Drexel Dragons men's basketball seasons
Drexel
Drexel
Drexel